Taihe East railway station is a railway station on the Shangqiu–Hangzhou high-speed railway in Taihe County, Fuyang, Anhui, China. Opened on 1 December 2019, this is the second railway station to serve the Taihe urban area. Taihe North railway station offers conventional rail service.

References

Railway stations in Anhui
Railway stations in China opened in 2019